"Flight 309 to Tennessee" is a song written by Ronnie Scott, and made famous by American country music artist Shelly West.  It originally charted at #36 in 1974 on the Billboard Easy Listening chart for Vicki Britton, a Dallas-based singer/songwriter on Bell Records. Shelly's cover was released in July 1983 as the second single from the album West by West.  The song reached #4 on the Billboard Hot Country Singles & Tracks chart.

Chart performance

Other versions
Beverly Bremers released a version of the song as a single in November 1976.

References

1976 songs
1976 singles
1983 singles
Shelly West songs
Beverly Bremers songs
Song recordings produced by Snuff Garrett
Columbia Records singles
Songs written by Ronnie Scott (songwriter)